The Suzuki DR-Z400 is a dual-sport motorcycle manufactured by Suzuki beginning in 2000.  It is powered by a single-cylinder, carbureted, liquid-cooled four-stroke engine.

Kawasaki marketed a private labeled version of the DR-Z known as the KLX400  – it is nearly identical to the DR-Z400 except for bodywork and some accessories.

The DR-Z is used by the Australian Army and is slightly modified for the Army role.

The DR-Z400 has been produced in four variants:
 DR-Z400 - kick-start only, not street legal (US), possibly street legal (AUS).
 DR-Z400E - electric-start, not street legal (US), street legal (AUS)
 DR-Z400S - street legal (headlight, taillight, turn signals, mirrors and horn)
 DR-Z400SM - Supermoto, first year 2005, street legal, comes standard with  sportbike inspired wheels, oversize front and rear brakes, RMZ rear swing-arm and inverted forks.

References

External links

 DR-Z400s - American Suzuki Motorcycles official site

DR-Z400
Dual-sport motorcycles
Single-cylinder motorcycles